Ratan Lal Basu (Bengali: রতন লাল বসু; born 23 December 1948) is an economist and English fiction author.

Childhood and parents
The place of birth of Dr. Ratan Lal Basu is the village Belakoba in the Jalpaiguri district of West Bengal, India. He was born on 23 December 1948. His father Sri Mahendra Lal Bose was educated from St. Xavier’s School and College, Calcutta, he later on got settled at the village Belakoba and played a pioneering role in establishing many schools in the remote villages of the Jalpaiguri district.

Education
Dr. Basu studied in and passed Higher Secondary Examination from Belakoba High School 17 km from Jalpaiguri town.
Dr. Basu did his Honors and M.A. degrees in Economics from  Presidency College, Kolkata, then affiliated with the University of Kolkata, and at present upgraded to Presidency University, Kolkata, and did Ph.D. on the Arthashastra of Kautilya, a treatise on Economics, Politics and Espionage, written around 300 B.C.

Service
Dr. Basu joined a Government-sponsored college affiliated with the University of Calcutta, as a Lecturer in Economics and later on became a Reader and retired as the Teacher-in-Charge (Acting Principal).

He was the Treasurer, Bengal Economic Association (Bangiya Arthaniti Parishad) from June 2009 to May 2014.

He has been a faculty of Fundación MenteClara, Berazategui, Buenos Aires, Argentina since September 26, 2020.

Bibliography

Short Stories

Bengali
 Ganga Devi and Proud Bratin
 O-Sadharan Sundar
 Angel of Tendong Mountain
 We are Fine
 Jodi Hotam

English
 Blue Are the Far off Mountains
 The Magic Marble
 Dream in a Rainy Day
 The Gladiator
 Albidah
 Dream Portrait
 The Crucial Moment
 Major Singh's Secret
 Terrorist's Leaflet
 The Witch's Mirror
 The Mysterious Drinker
 Jasmine
 The Noble Deed of Inspector Rao
 We Are Happy
 Strangeness is Beauty
 The Tale of Two Cities
 The Puja Night
 Monsoon Tears
 The First Rain
 Goddess Mansa and Bhrigu's Mirror
 The Mischievous Idol
 Tagore Ocampo Romance the Untold Story

Collection of Short Stories

Bengali
 Asadharan Sundar O Anyanya Galpo
 Galper Fuljhuri
 Dairir Pata Theke
 Bhat Dal Debeto O Anyany Galpo Duburi Mon Mukta Khoje Durer Pahar O Anyany Galpo Ganesh Thakurer Bhakta O Anyany Galpo Jakhan Samay Thamke Daray Nil Pahar O Anyanya Galpo Pratibimbo Rang Beranger Manush Smritir Pata ThekeEnglish
 Blue Are the Far Off Mountains Dream In A Rainy Day The Gladiator & Other Stories Horror Of Yakshini Mod Lady and the Prabhus Stories for Children Tragedy of the Pugilist The Witch’s Mirror & Other Stories Stories of Love and RomanceNovels

Bengali
 Swapno Smriti Bastab Swapno Swapner Sandhane Aviker Prem Natun Asha

English
 The Oraon and His Tree Friend
 The Curse of the Goddess
 The Tribal and the Divine Tree

Travelogue
 Fantastic Hill Trek
 Tagore, Hepburn and Shahrukh Khan

Economics
 Ancient Indian Economic Thought, Relevance for Today
 Material Progress, Ethics & Human Development
 Kautilya's Arthashastra (300 B.C.): Economic Ideas
 Mahabharata, the Great Indian Epic: Economic Ideas
 Manusmriti, the Hindu Law Book: Economic Ideas
 Glimpses of the Indian Economy: Ancient & Modern
 Economic Concepts: Ancient & Modern
 Global Crisis and Adam Smith
 Democracy and Future of Mankind
 The Political Economy of Ancient India
 Ancient Indian Political Economy
 Price Control Mechanism in Arthasastra
 Poverty, Amartya Sen and Adam Smith
 Price Policy in Arthasastra

Hindu philosophy
 Raj Yoga
 Karma Yoga
 Principles of Hatha Yoga
 Bhakti Yoga
 Lord Krishna Mystery
 Atharva Veda, A Brief Outline
 Tantra Cult
 Tantra Cult and Yoga
 "Scientific and Beneficial Aspects of Tantra Cult"

Espionage
 Horror of Soviet Secret Police
 Stories of Spies
 Espionage Agency Mossad and Eichmann Drama
 Espionage Mechanism in the Arthasastra of Kautilya
 Espionage Agencies and Remarkable Spies
 Cold War, KGB & Soviet Social Imperialism
 Espionage Methods and The Horror of Echelon-Imint and The CIA
 Atomic Espionage and Atom Spies

References

Writers from Kolkata
1948 births
Living people
University of Calcutta alumni
Academic staff of the University of Calcutta